Madarsa Talimul Arabi (Hindi:मदरसा तालीम उल अरबी, Urdu:مدرسه), Amsin, Faizabad, is an Arabic, Urdu, English and Hindi, co-educational madarasa and school from prep to grade 8 founded and run by Madarsa Talim ul Arabi trust. The school is located in Amsin Bazar, a gram panchayat of Faizabad district, in the Indian state of Uttar Pradesh. Founded in ~1995 by late Mr. Izhar Alam Shaikh, the madarsa/school works under the management of the Society and public trust.

Amsin